Oxbridge Academy Foundation, Inc. is a private coeducational college-preparatory middle and high school in West Palm Beach, Florida. Oxbridge Academy serves grades 7–12. Aimed at students of all socioeconomic backgrounds, the school has physical therapist on staff, chef-prepared lunches, a sailing and equestrian team, and a flight simulator.

Academics

Computer Science Program
The Computer Science program at Oxbridge consists of a four-year course in Computer Science. Computer Science I consists of studies in Python and basic algorithms. Computer Science II introduces students to programming in Java. Advanced courses in Web Application Development, Unity Game Development, and Data Structures and Algorithms are offered to third and fourth year Computer Science students.

History 

The school was funded with a $50 million donation from Bill Koch. Koch's goal was to create a school for his own children where academically gifted students of all socioeconomic backgrounds could do hands-on projects and learn by problem solving, a place where students ruled. Oxbridge was opened in under a year on a 45-acre campus that once held a Jewish community center. By 2016 he had spent more than $75 million on the school.

In 2011, Koch hired Robert C. Parsons to lead the school under titles president and chief executive.

By 2014, the school added a football team at the request of the student body. In April 2016, Mr. Koch announced that Academic Dean John Klemme would serve as the School's president, placing Mr. Parsons on paid leave pending an investigation of harassment claims. Parsons compensation package was worth $1 million, with an annual salary of about $600,000 per year.

On May 27, 2016, Koch fired Parsons and declined to renew the contracts of Director of Athletics Craig Sponsky and the football coach Doug Socha; Koch noted that a "power elites group" in the school "ran the asylum".

In July 2016, David Rosow was elected President and CEO of Oxbridge Academy.

On June 20, 2018, the school announced that it was ending its football program after a number of its players transferred to other schools.

Athletics recruiting violations 
In 2016, the school self-reported athletic recruiting violations and forfeited all athletic victories for the previous two years, including three FHSAA district championships.

Notable alumni 
 Travis Homer, NFL player for the Seattle Seahawks

References

External links 
 

Private high schools in Florida
High schools in Palm Beach County, Florida
Buildings and structures in West Palm Beach, Florida
2011 establishments in Florida
Educational institutions established in 2011
Oxbridge